Ian Watson may refer to:

 Ian Watson (author) (born 1943), British science fiction author
 Ian Watson (basketball) (born 1949), Australian Olympic basketball player
 Ian Watson (cricketer) (born 1947), English cricketer
 Ian Watson (footballer, born 1944), English footballer
 Ian Watson (footballer, born 1960), English footballer for Sunderland
 Ian Watson (priest) (born 1950), Archdeacon of Coventry
 Ian Watson (politician) (born 1934), Liberal party member of the Canadian House of Commons
 Ian Watson (rugby league) (born 1976), Welsh rugby league footballer
 Iain Watson, British journalist and BBC political correspondent